Burretiodendron is a genus of trees. Traditionally included in the family Tiliaceae, it is included in the expanded Malvaceae in the APG and most subsequent systematics. It contains some species formerly in the (not too closely related) Pentace. Thus, Parapentace Gagnep. may be a synonym of Burretiodendron rather than Pentace.

These are deciduous or semi-evergreen trees with heart-shaped leaves and winged capsules.

This genus is native to and distributed in Asia, from southern China to Vietnam, Myanmar, and Thailand.

Species
Species include:
Burretiodendron brilletii (Gagnep.) Kosterm. northern Vietnam
Burretiodendron esquirolii (H.Lév.) Rehder southern China, Myanmar, Thailand
Burretiodendron hsienmu 
Burretiodendron kydiifolium Y.C.Hsu & R.Zhuge southern Yunnan (China)
Burretiodendron obconicum W.Y.Chun & F.C.How Guangxi (China)
Burretiodendron siamense Kosterm. west-central Thailand and Mergui Archipelago (Myanmar)
Burretiodendron tonkinense (A.Chev.) Kosterm. Yunnan and Guangxi (China), and northern Vietnam
Burretiodendron yunnanense

References

 
Malvaceae genera
Taxonomy articles created by Polbot
Dombeyoideae
Indomalayan realm flora